Hunt With the Hounds is a mystery novel by Mignon G. Eberhart. It is one of her stand-alone mysteries. It was published as A Witness for my Love in the June & July 1950 issues of Woman's Home Companion, then published by Random House in 1950 as part of its "Detective Book Club" series. It was reprinted as a mass market paperback in 1963 by Popular Library, and in 2011 by Symonds Press.

Plot outline 
The action takes place in Bedford, Virginia, a fox-hunting region. The story starts out with the acquittal of Jed Bailey for the murder of his wife Ernestine. The blame is then leveled upon Sue Poore, the "other woman" in the case.

References

External links 
Hunt With the Hounds at Kirkus Reviews
Hunt With the Hounds at Goodreads

1950 American novels
American romance novels
American mystery novels
Novels set in Virginia
Random House books
Bedford, Virginia
Novels by Mignon G. Eberhart
Works originally published in Woman's Home Companion